Gerald Skinner was a former player in the National Football League. He was drafted in the fourth round of the 1977 NFL Draft by the New England Patriots and later played with the Green Bay Packers during the 1978 NFL season.

Skinner was an All-SWC selection as an offensive tackle after his senior season at Arkansas. He helped the Razorbacks win a share of the 1975 Southwest Conference Championship by beating #2 Texas A&M in the season finale. Arkansas would finish 10-2 and ranked in the Top Ten after a victory over the Georgia Bulldogs in the 1976 Cotton Bowl Classic. 

After his playing days were over, Skinner earned a master's degree at the University of Central Arkansas, and spent a number of years as a teacher and football coach in Conway, Arkansas. He would go on to be a project manager for Fort Smith Glass Company and Overhead Door. 

Skinner died unexpectedly from a heart attack. Memorial contributions were made to the American Heart Association in his honor.

References

People from Malvern, Arkansas
Players of American football from Arkansas
Green Bay Packers players
Arkansas Razorbacks football players
1954 births
Living people